Manuel Mota (born October 22, 1970) is a jazz guitarist from Lisbon, Portugal.

Career
Mota started playing guitar at 15. Although his interest was in blues rock, he turned to free improvisation and experimental music in the 1980s. He has a degree in architecture and owns the record label Headlights.

Discography

As leader
 I Wish I'd Never Met You (Headlights, 1999)
 For Your Protection Why Don't You Just Paint Yourself Real Good Like an Indian (Headlights, 2001)
 Leopardo (Rossbin, 2002)
 Quartets (Headlights, 2004)
 Outubro (Headlights, 2006)
 Sings (Headlights, 2009)
 ST 13 (Headlights, 2014)
 090114 (Headlights, 2014)
 Blackie - Solo Guitar (Headlights, 2014)
 Sete (Headlights, 2015)
 Exodus (Headlights, 2015)
 Lacrau with David Grubbs (Blue Chopsticks, 2018)

References

Male guitarists
Portuguese jazz guitarists
1970 births
Living people
Avant-garde jazz guitarists
21st-century guitarists
21st-century male musicians
Male jazz musicians